The 2016–17 Manhattan Jaspers basketball team represented Manhattan College during the 2016–17 NCAA Division I men's basketball season. The Jaspers, led by sixth-year head coach Steve Masiello, played their home games at Draddy Gymnasium in Riverdale, New York as members of the Metro Atlantic Athletic Conference. They finished the season 10–22, 5–15 in MAAC play to finish in a tie for tenth place. They lost in the first round of the MAAC tournament to Rider.

Previous season
The Jaspers finished the 2015–16 season 13–18, 9–11 in MAAC play to finish in sixth place. They defeated Marist in the first round of the MAAC tournament before losing to Siena in the quarterfinals.

Roster

Schedule and results

|-
!colspan=9 style=| Regular season

 
 
 
 
 
 

 
  

|-
!colspan=9 style=| MAAC tournament

References

Manhattan Jaspers basketball seasons
Manhattan
Manhattan
Manhattan